Haematopota grandis is a species of Horse-fly. Its common name is the long-horned cleg. It is native to Europe, where it is distributed in Albania, Austria, Bulgaria, Czech Republic, Denmark, France, Germany, Greece, Hungary, Italy, Moldova, Romania, Slovakia, Spain, Sweden, Switzerland, Ukraine, and all states of former Yugoslavia (except North Macedonia).

Description and habitat
Its habitat includes salt marshes.

References

External links
Haematopota grandis on Flickr
Haematopota grandis on Essex Field Club

Tabanidae
Insects described in 1820
Diptera of Europe
Taxa named by Johann Wilhelm Meigen